Suldaan Said Ahmed (b. 12 February 1993) is a Finnish politician who is a member of the Parliament of Finland and the Helsinki City Council for the Left Alliance. Said Ahmed is the first Somalian-born member of the Finnish parliament. In July 2022, Said Ahmed was appointed Finland's Minister for Foreign Affairs' Special Representative on Peace Mediation in the Horn of Africa.

Life and career 
Said Ahmed was born in Mogadishu and immigrated to Finland in 2008 through family reunification. He lived in Kontiolahti, North Karelia, and moved to Helsinki in 2011. Said Ahmed has a security guard education and has also worked as a community worker for the Helsinki Deaconess Foundation.

Said Ahmed was elected to the Helsinki City Council in the 2017 municipal elections and re-elected in 2021. In the 2019 parliamentary election Said Ahmed became a vice deputy. As the MP Paavo Arhinmäki was selected the Helsinki Deputy Mayor, Said Ahmed took his place in September 2021.

Family 
Suldaan Said Ahmed is the brother of the footballers Ahmed Said Ahmed and Abdulkadir Said Ahmed.

References 

1993 births
People from Mogadishu
Somalian emigrants to Finland
Politicians from Helsinki
Members of the Parliament of Finland (2019–23)
Left Alliance (Finland) politicians
Living people